Vinton was Bobby Vinton's nineteenth studio album, released in 1969. Three singles came from the album: "To Know You Is to Love You", "The Days of Sand and Shovels" and "No Arms Can Ever Hold You".

Cover versions include Herb Alpert's hit "This Guy's in Love with You", "When I Fall in Love", Tammy Wynette's hit "Stand by Your Man", "It's a Sin to Tell a Lie", "Try a Little Tenderness" and the McGuire Sisters' hit "May You Always".

Track listing

Personnel
Bobby Vinton - vocals
Billy Sherrill - producer
Bill Walker - arranger ("This Guy's in Love With You" and "May You Always")
Bill McElhiney - arranger ("To Know You Is to Love You" and "The Days of Sand and Shovels")
Bob Golden - cover photo

Charts

Singles

References

1969 albums
Bobby Vinton albums
Albums produced by Billy Sherrill
Epic Records albums